The European Economic Review is a peer-reviewed academic journal that covers research in economics. The journal was established in 1969 and the five main editors are: Florin Bilbiie, (University of Lausanne); David K. Levine, (European University Institute); Isabelle Mejean, (Ecole Polytechnique); Peter Rupert, (University of California at Santa Barbara); and Robert Sauer, (Royal Holloway University of London).

According to the Journal Citation Reports, the journal has a 2020 impact factor of 2.146.

References

External links
 

Economics journals
Elsevier academic journals
Publications established in 1969
English-language journals
8 times per year journals